Kevin John Hollis (born 5 January 1983) is an English cricketer. Hollis is a left-handed batsman who plays primarily as a wicketkeeper. He was born at Derby, Derbyshire.

Hollis represented the Derbyshire Cricket Board in List A cricket. His debut List A match came against Derbyshire in the 2000 NatWest Trophy. From 2000 to 2001, he represented the Board in 4 matches, the last of which came against Bedfordshire in the 1st round of the 2002 Cheltenham & Gloucester Trophy which was held in 2001. In his 4 List A matches, he scored 18 runs at a batting average of 9.00, with a high score of 7*. Behind the stumps he took a single catch and made 2 stumpings.

References

External links
Kevin Hollis at Cricinfo
Kevin Hollis at CricketArchive

1983 births
Living people
Cricketers from Derby
English cricketers
Derbyshire Cricket Board cricketers
Wicket-keepers